Ahmad Haidar Anuawar (born 25 April 1986) is a Malaysian professional racing cyclist, who currently rides for UCI Continental team .

Major results

2007
 1st Stage 3 Tour of Siam
 1st Stage 3 Cepa Tour
2014
 6th Critérium International de Blida

References

External links

1986 births
Living people
Malaysian male cyclists
Malaysian people of Malay descent